Zhang Wule (born 1937) is a People's Republic of China politician. He was born in Anxin County, Hebei. He was governor of Gansu from 1986 to 1993. He was a delegate to the 8th National People's Congress (1993–1998).

References

1937 births
Living people
People's Republic of China politicians from Hebei
Chinese Communist Party politicians from Hebei
Governors of Gansu
Members of the 9th Chinese People's Political Consultative Conference
Delegates to the 8th National People's Congress